Asaphomyia is a genus of horse flies in the family Tabanidae.

Species
A. floridensis Pechuman, 1974
A. texensis Stone, 1953

References

Tabanidae
Brachycera genera
Diptera of North America